The Eagle Mountains are located in northeastern Riverside County, California, U.S.

Geography
The range lies to the north of Interstate 10 (California) off County Route R2 (California) and west— and southwest of the Coxcomb Mountains.  They are the location of Eagle Mountain, the Kaiser Steel Eagle Mountain iron mine's ghost town, and one of the largest open pit iron ore mines, now closed, in the country.

The Eagle Mountains lie partly within eastern Joshua Tree National Park. The mountains reach an elevation of  inside the park, at the western end of the range near Cottonwood Pass.

They are in the Colorado Desert region of the Sonoran Desert, approaching the transition to the higher Mojave Desert  at coordinates .

See also
List of Sonoran Desert wildflowers						
List of flora of the Sonoran Desert Region by common name
North American desert flora
Joshua Tree National Park wiki-index
Mountain ranges of the Colorado Desert
Mountain ranges of the Mojave Desert
Protected areas of the Mojave Desert
Protected areas of the Colorado Desert

References

External links
 Official Joshua Tree National Park website
 Bird Checklist for Joshua Tree National Park

Mountain ranges of the Mojave Desert
Mountain ranges of the Colorado Desert
Mountain ranges of Riverside County, California
Mountain ranges of Southern California
Joshua Tree National Park
Protected areas of the Colorado Desert
Protected areas of Riverside County, California